Figure skating was first contested in the Olympic Games at the 1908 Summer Olympics. Since 1924, the sport has been a part of the Winter Olympic Games.

Men's singles, ladies' singles, and pair skating have been held most often. Ice dance joined as a medal sport in 1976 and a team event debuted at the 2014 Olympics. Special figures were contested at only one Olympics, in 1908. Synchronized skating has never appeared at the Olympics but aims to be included.

History 
Figure skating was first contested as an Olympic sport at the 1908 Summer Olympics, in London, United Kingdom. As this traditional winter sport could be conducted indoors, the International Olympic Committee (IOC) approved its inclusion in the Summer Olympics program. It was featured a second time at the Antwerp Games, after which it was permanently transferred to the program of the Winter Olympic Games, first held in 1924 in Chamonix, France.

In London, figure skating was presented in four events: men's singles, women's singles, men's special figures, and mixed pairs. The special figures contest was won by Russian Nikolai Panin, who gave his country its first ever Olympic gold medal. He remains the event's sole winner, as it was subsequently dropped from the program.

Ice dance joined as a medal sport in 1976, after appearing as a demonstration event at Grenoble 1968.

A team event debuted at the 2014 Olympics. It consists of two segments: qualification and finals. During qualification each team has one men's single skater, one ladies' single skater, one pair, and one ice dance couple skate their short program/dance. Before the finals, each team is allowed to replace up to two skaters/couples. The final consists of each skater/couple skating their free program/dance. Results are determined by placement points.

Summary

Qualifying 
The number of entries for the figure skating events at the Olympic Games is limited by a quota set by the International Olympic Committee. There are 30 participants in each singles events (ladies and men), 20 pairs, and 24 ice dance duos.

In the past, skaters must represent a member nation of the International Skating Union and reach the age of fifteen before July 1 of the previous year. After the previous 2022 Olympic Games, this rule has changed and the new age requirement by the next Olympics will be 17-years-old. They are also required to be citizens of the country they are representing. Competitors have until just before the Olympics to receive citizenship. Since nationality rules are less strict for the ISU Championships, sometimes skaters who have competed at World or European championships are not eligible for the Olympics.

80% of the Olympic spots (24 men/ladies, 19 dance couples, 16 pairs) are allotted to countries according to the results of the previous year's World Figure Skating Championships. A country may have a maximum of three entries per discipline. Countries earn two or three entries by earning points through their skaters' placements. The points are equal to the sum of the placements of the country's skaters (top two if they have three). If a country only has one skater/couple, that skater/couple must place in the top ten to earn two entries and in the top two to earn three entries. If a country has two skaters/teams, the combined placement of those teams must be 13 or less to qualify 3 entries, and 28 or less to qualify two entries. The remaining places are awarded to one skater/couple each from countries that failed to get multiple places, in order of their skaters' placement in the world championships.

Following the World Championships, countries that have not qualified an entry in a particular discipline receive another opportunity in an international competition held in the autumn (usually the Nebelhorn Trophy) prior to the Olympic Games. Six spots are available in men's singles, six in ladies' singles, four in pairs, and five in ice dance. At some Olympics, the host country is automatically entitled to one entry in each discipline, e.g. in 1994, 2010, and 2018 if minimum scores are achieved. If a country receives a spot by being the host, one fewer spot is available in the autumn qualifying competition.

The selection of representatives is at the national governing body's discretion. Some countries rely on the results of their national championships while others have more varied criteria. This may include reaching a certain placement at the European Figure Skating Championships and the Four Continents Figure Skating Championships.

Scoring and Judging System 
Within the sport of figure skating, there is a very specific scoring system that must be followed and is used for every discipline. This is referred to as IJS, or International Judging System. The two kinds of scoring you will receive during a figure skating competition is the technical score and the program components. Each technical element that is attempted in a program has a specific base value of points, which varies based on the element. Additionally, elements such as spins and step sequences can achieve different levels, which can add or subtract points from that elements final score. At the end of the program, all of your technical element points will be added up to form your technical score. The second aspect to the scoring system in figure skating is the program components. These are determined by the overall presentation of your performance and be separated into five categories. The categories consist of skating skills, transitions, performance, composition, and interpretation of the music. Like the technical elements score, these categories will be added together at the end of the program to determine the program components score. Then, you take your final technical elements score and program components score and add them together to create your final segment score.  

The judging system consists of two parts, the technical panel and the judges. The technical panel involves five people that play different roles in judging the technical elements of a skaters program. First, there is the technical specialist. This judge using the rules developed by the International Skating Union to identify each element and its level of difficulty. The two judges whom support the main technical specialist are referred to as the technical controllers and assistant technical specialist. They make sure the primary specialist has correctly identified the elements and make any final decisions on the technical elements presented in the program. They final two roles presented by the technical panel include the data operator and video replay operator. Separately from the technical panel is the judging panel, which is made up of nine judges. Their job is to judge the quality of each element done by the skater regarding the technical elements, as well as evaluate the program components shown in the program. They do this by a great of execution score, GOE, that ranges from –5 to +5 and determines how many points can be added or subtracted from the base value of an element.

New Age Rules in the Olympics 
Within figure skating, there is a set minimum age limit for all elite competitors through the sport. This age was 15 years old, until the most recent Olympic Games in Beijing. During this event in 2022, 15-year-old Russian figure skater Kamila Valieva was the favorite to win the Ladie's single event, until she was found to have a positive drug test for a banned substance previously to the competition. The International Olympic Committee had to conduct an investigation into Valieva during the Olympics, which brought a great amount of chaos and controversy as to whether she should have been allowed to compete or not. More importantly, it brought attention to the conditions young athletes are faced with physically, mentally, and emotionally as they are preparing for this event, having this not been the first time a situation such as this has occurred. After the Games this year, the International Skating Union came together to review what had happened and how to proceed in the future. A proposal was then created to increase the minimum age limit for elite competitors throughout the sport to 17. The vote was determined 100 to 16 in favor of this and will be implemented slowly over the course of the next three years, before the 2026 Games in Milan. This decision was based on preserving the physical, mental, and emotional health and wellbeing of figure skaters, and can be summarize by Eric Radford, three time Canadian Olympic medalist, who stated, “Is a medal worth risking the health of a child or young athlete?”

Synchronized Skating in the Olympics 
There is a fifth additional discipline of figure skating besides the four previously mentioned, and that is synchronized skating. Synchronize skating adds a team element to figure skating, having eight to twenty skaters on the ice at once. They skate together in unison performing difficult step sequences and formations together. This version of skating has been a part of the competition scene for many years, being involved in competitions through the United States, as well as internationally around the world. But it has yet to be an aspect of the Olympic Games. The governing body for competitive skating is the ISU, International Skating Union, who determine all the decisions about figure skating internationally. The International Olympic Committee, IOC, is an executive board that makes decisions on sports in the Olympics in general. They have yet to make the decision to add synchronized skating as an Olympic event. This has been a very controversial debate over the years and many feel it is wrong that this discipline of the sport is left out in contrast to the others. The IOC determines adding a sport to the Olympics is based on how many athletes and officials would be included, how popular the sport is, and how much money it would bring to them. The ISU has been making efforts the past several years to "investigate, strategize and gather the information required for Synchronized Skating to be accepted as an Olympic discipline." They were attempting to get it approved for the most recent games in Beijing, but it didn't make the cut. For now synchronized skating in the Olympics is a still a dream for most, but maybe it can become a reality in the near future.

Events

Medal table 

Accurate as of 2022 Winter Olympics.

Participating nations 
The number in each box represents the number of figure skaters the nation sent.

Medals per year

See also
List of Olympic medalists in figure skating
List of Olympic medalists in figure skating by age
List of Olympic venues in figure skating
Major achievements in figure skating by nation

References 
General
 ISU – Olympic Games Figure Skating results:
 1908–2002 Men Ladies Pairs Ice dance
 2002 2006 2010 2014 2018 2022

Specific

External links 

 International Skating Union

Figure skating at the Olympic Games
Olympics
Olympics
Sports at the Winter Olympics
Discontinued sports at the Summer Olympics